Lists of baseball parks is a list of lists, by city, of professional baseball venues. This is an ongoing project, with lists being added from time to time.

Canada 

British Columbia
Vancouver

Ontario
Toronto

Quebec
Montreal

England

Derby
Derby Baseball Ground – Derby Baseball Club (1890–1900)

London
London Stadium – MLB London Series (2019)

Indonesia
Jakarta
Gelora Bung Karno Baseball Stadium
Jakarta International Baseball Arena

Riau
Riau Baseball Stadium

South Sumatera
Jakabaring Baseball Field

Japan 
Japan

United States

Arizona

Phoenix and Maricopa County

California
Los Angeles area
Oakland
San Diego
San Francisco

Colorado
Denver

District of Columbia
Washington

Florida
Miami
Tampa Bay area
Spring Training sites

Georgia
Atlanta

Illinois
Chicago

Indiana
Indianapolis

Kentucky
Louisville

Louisiana
New Orleans

Maryland
Baltimore

Massachusetts
Boston

Michigan
Detroit

Minnesota
Twin Cities Metro Area

Missouri
Kansas City
St. Louis

Nebraska
Omaha

New Jersey
Jersey City
Newark

New York
Buffalo
New York City
Rochester
Syracuse

Ohio
Cincinnati
Cleveland
Columbus
Toledo

Oregon
Portland

Pennsylvania
Philadelphia
Pittsburgh

Rhode Island
Providence

Tennessee
Memphis
Nashville

Texas
Dallas-Fort Worth Metroplex
Houston
San Antonio

Utah
Salt Lake City

Washington
Seattle
Tacoma

Wisconsin
Milwaukee

See also
Baseball park
Baseball field
List of baseball parks by capacity
List of jewel box baseball parks
List of baseball parks used in film and television

External links 
Retrosheet Ballparks Directory
Ballparks
Ballpark Reviews
Ballparks of Baseball
Clem's Baseball
Project Ballpark